Pune–Lucknow Express is an Express train of the Indian Railways connecting  in Maharashtra and  of Uttar Pradesh. It is currently being operated with 11407/11408 train numbers on a weekly basis.

Service

The 11407/Pune–Lucknow Express has an average speed of 52 km/hr and covers 1481 km in 28 hrs 30 mins. 11408/Lucknow–Pune Express has an average speed of 52 km/hr and covers 1481 km in 28 hrs 30 mins.

Route and halts 

The important halts of the train are:

Coach composition

The train has standard ICF rakes with max speed of 110 kmph. The train consists of 16 coaches:

 1 AC II Tier
 2 AC III Tier
 5 Sleeper coaches
 6 General
 2 Second-class Luggage/parcel van

Traction

Both trains are hauled by a Bhusawal Loco Shed-based WAP-4 electric locomotive from Pune to Lucknow and vice versa.

Direction reversal

The train reverses its direction 1 times:

Rake share 

This train shares a rake 11405/11406 Pune–Amravati Express.

See also 

 Pune–Amravati Express
 Pune–Danapur Superfast Express
 Pune–Manduadih Gyan Ganga Express

Notes

External links 

 11407/Pune–Lucknow Jn Express India Rail Info
 11408/Lucknow Jn–Pune Express India Rail Info

References 

Express trains in India
Rail transport in Maharashtra
Rail transport in Madhya Pradesh
Passenger trains originating from Lucknow
Transport in Pune
Railway services introduced in 2015